Canadian Natural Resources Limited, or CNRL or Canadian Natural is a senior Canadian oil and natural gas company that operates primarily in the Western Canadian provinces of British Columbia, 
Alberta, Saskatchewan, and Manitoba, with offshore operations in the United Kingdom sector of the North Sea, and offshore Côte d'Ivoire and Gabon. The company, which is headquartered in Calgary, Alberta, has the largest undeveloped base in the Western Canadian Sedimentary Basin. It is the largest independent producer of natural gas in Western Canada and the largest producer of heavy crude oil in Canada.

In the 2020 Forbes Global 2000, Canadian Natural Resources was ranked as the 306th-largest public company in the world.

Overview
CBC described CNRL as a "Calgary-based oil and gas giant." CNRL owns and operates Horizon Oil Sands and the Athabasca Oil Sands Project (AOSP) which are about 70 km north of Fort McMurray, Alberta in the Athabasca region. According to a May 13, 2021 Forbes report, CNRL had a market capitalization of $36.6 billion, and sales of $12.6 billion with 9,709 employees.

Operations

The company also owns two operated pipeline systems, an electricity cogeneration facility, and a 50% interest in the North West Redwater Partnership.

In 2018, production came as follows:
 Synthetic crude from oil sands mining in Northern Alberta - 39% of production.
 Natural gas, primarily produced in Alberta, British Columbia, and Saskatchewan - 24% of production
 Light and medium crude oil and natural gas liquids - 13% of production
 Bitumen - 10% of production
 Primary heavy crude oil - 8% of production
 Pelican Lake heavy crude oil - 6% of production

It includes a surface oil sands mining and bitumen extraction plant and bitumen upgrading with associated infrastructure. The company sanctioned the Horizon Oil Sands Project in February 2005 and it began production in early 2009.

History

The company was founded on November 7, 1973 as AEX Minerals Corporation and adopted the present name in 1975.

In 1998, the company sold land to Remington Energy for C$127.5 million.

In 1999, the company and Penn West Petroleum (now Obsidian Energy) acquired the Canadian assets of BP Amoco.

In 2000, the company acquired Ranger Oil for C$1.08 billion.

In 2002, the company acquired Rio Alto for $2.4 billion.

In February 2004, the company acquired Petrovera Resources, a joint venture between Encana and ConocoPhillips.

In September 2006, the company acquired the Canadian operations of Anadarko Petroleum for US$4.1 billion.

In April 2014, the company acquired the conventional assets in Canada of Devon Energy for C$3.125 billion.

In 2017, the company acquired the Canadian oil sands assets of Royal Dutch Shell, including a 70% working interest in the Athabasca Oil Sands Project, for $5.3 billion in cash plus 97,560,975 shares. The shares were sold in 2018.

In August 2018, the company acquired the idled Joslyn oil sands project from Total S.A. and its partners.

In September 2018, the company acquired Laricina Energy for $46 million.

In June 2019, the company acquired the remaining assets in Canada of Devon Energy.

Incidents

Horizon tank farm collapse fatalities

The Association of Professional Engineers and Geoscientists of Alberta (APEGA) has reopened its inquiries into a fatal accident that occurred in the oil sands in 2007.

The association’s director of communications told the Edmonton Journal that they had only recently received a final copy of the Alberta Occupational Health and Safety Incident report into what caused the collapse of a large tank under construction at the Canadian Natural Resources Ltd. Horizon oil sands site.

“Even though it’s been a long time between the time the event occurred and the time that report was done, we felt obliged to take a closer look at that new information,” said Mulder.

The collapse of the tank roof structure occurred during windy conditions on April 24, 2007. The large tank was one of 11 being constructed by SSEC Canada, a Chinese company, on the east tank farm on the CNRL Horizon site, 70 kilometres north of Fort McMurray.The tank was to be a circular steel high-cone roof tank, 56.5 metres in diameter and 19.8 metres high. At the time of the accident, the tank’s roof support structure was only partially complete and the roof was suspended by cables. A team of temporary workers from China were inside the tank working on the structure when it started to collapse inwards. Some of the workers managed to escape through holes in the tank’s wall, but an “electrical consultant” who was standing on top of a welding machine was struck by falling steel and thrown onto scaffolding. He was pronounced dead at the scene. A scaffolder who was on the tank floor was also crushed by the falling steel and died on the way to hospital in Fort McMurray. Two other workers in the tank were seriously injured.

APEGA says it is now investigating because the health and safety report indicates that a professional engineer was not involved as was required.

Indeed, the analysis in the health and safety report includes several indications that professional oversight was lacking and labour rules were being ignored:
For example, at 8.1.2: “Tenth Construction Company of Sinopec (TCC) [a Chinese construction company ] did not take reasonable practical measures to protect the health and safety of the Electrical Cosultant. The tank roof support structure that collapsed onto the worker was a skeleton structure. The erection procedures for erecting the roof support structures had not been prepared and certified by a Professional Engineer. The Electrical Consultant did not have a work permit as a temporary foreign worker and thus should not have been working at this work site.”

The report makes it clear that the structural design of the tank was inadequate:At 7.2.6: “The roof support structure was a completely bolted structure using ASTM A-307 Grade B bolts without the use of wedges or washes. The bolted roof support structure, which was required to be flexible, did not have the necessary restraints to resist the lateral forces generated by the wind.

And, at 7.27. “The number and size of guy wires that were supporting the roof support structure in tanks 72-TK-1A and 72-TK-1B, was not designed for the static and dynamic loads imposed by the 33 to 45 km/h wind that occurred on the day of the incident, let alone for the maximum expected wind speed of 83 km/h as determined by the Alberta Building Code, or 190 km/h recommended by the American Petroleum Institute.”

Primrose oil seeps

In June 2013, the Alberta Energy Regulator investigated reports of leaks in the company's Primrose East oil sands project. The regulator concluded that nearly a million litres of bitumen mixed with water had seeped into the ground around the site.

Slave Lake pipeline spill

In April 2014, a pipeline owned by the company spilled 70,000 liters of oil and processed water northwest of Slave Lake, Alberta.

Red Earth Creek pipeline spill

In November 2014, a  pipeline owned by the company spilled almost 60,000 liters of crude oil into a muskeg region 27 kilometers from Red Earth Creek, Alberta.

Leadership

Chairman of the Board 
Allan P. Markin, 1989–2012
N. Murray Edwards, 2012–

President 
Dr Aaro E. Aho, 1973–1975
H. Stanley Cornwell, 1975–1976
Robert A. Boulware, 1976–1985
John G. Langille, 1985–2005
Stephen W. Laut, 2005–2018
Timothy S. McKay, 2018–

See also
 Petroleum industry in Canada
 Environmental issues in Alberta
 Western Canadian Select
 Kirby Lake Aerodrome

References

External links
 

Oil companies of Canada
Natural gas companies of Canada
Companies based in Calgary
Energy companies established in 1973
Non-renewable resource companies established in 1973
Natural resources organizations
Companies listed on the Toronto Stock Exchange
S&P/TSX 60